The teams competing in Group 6 of the 2009 UEFA European Under-21 Championship qualifying competition are Denmark, Finland, Lithuania, Scotland and Slovenia.

Standings

Key:
Pts Points, Pld Matches played, W Won, D Drawn, L Lost, GF Goals for, GA Goals against, GD Goal Difference

Matches

Goalscorers

1 goal:
: Jonas Damborg, Lasse Schøne, Bo Storm
: Kasper Hämäläinen, Ville Jalasto, Jarno Parikka, Berat Sadik
: Dominykas Galkevicius, Evaldas Grigaitis
: Jamie Hamill, Kevin McDonald
: Anej Lovrečič, Rene Mihelič

Group 6
Under